Farnell Road railway station served the village of Farnell, Angus, Scotland from 1848 to 1956 on the Aberdeen Railway.

History 
The station opened in May 1848 by the Aberdeen Railway. To the west of the southbound platform was the signal box. The station closed to both passengers and goods traffic on 11 June 1956.

References

External links 

Disused railway stations in Angus, Scotland
Former Caledonian Railway stations
Railway stations in Great Britain opened in 1848
Railway stations in Great Britain closed in 1956
1848 establishments in Scotland
1956 disestablishments in Scotland